Neil Moshe Malamuth is a professor of psychology at the University of California, Los Angeles, known for his research on sexual violence and the effects of pornography on its viewers. He is a fellow of the American Psychological Association and the American Psychological Society.

References

External links
Faculty page

21st-century American psychologists
University of California, Los Angeles faculty
University of California, Los Angeles alumni
Evolutionary psychologists
Fellows of the American Psychological Association
Fellows of the Association for Psychological Science
Living people
Year of birth missing (living people)